"I Love Rock 'n' Roll" is a song by the Scottish alternative rock group The Jesus and Mary Chain and the second single from the group's album Munki. It was the band's last single before they split up. It was released by Creation Records in May 1998 and reached #38 in the UK single charts.

The song is a reworked version of a previous song, "I Hate Rock 'n' Roll", which was included in the band's 1995 compilation album, Hate Rock 'n' Roll.

Track listing
All tracks written by Jim Reid, except where noted.

7" (CRE 296) 
"I Love Rock 'n' Roll" - 2:37
"Nineteen666" (Dick Meaney, William Reid) - 3:31

CDS (CRESCD 296)
"I Love Rock 'n' Roll" - 2:37
"Easylife, easylove" - 4:08
"40,000K" - 2:51
"Nineteen666" (Meaney, W. Reid) - 3:31

Notes
 "Easylife, easylove" recorded at "The Wiskey Bar", Paramount Hotel, NYC.

Personnel

The Jesus and Mary Chain
 Jim Reid - vocals, guitar, production
 William Reid - guitar, production
 Ben Lurie - bass, guitar 
 Nick Sanderson - drums

Additional personnel
 Dick Meaney - engineer

References

The Jesus and Mary Chain songs
1998 singles
Songs written by William Reid (musician)
1995 songs
Creation Records singles